Flax lily may refer to two different plant genera:

 Dianella (plant)
 Phormium